A list of films produced in the United Kingdom in 1971 (see 1971 in film):

1971

Most Popular Films of the Year at British Box Office
Source: Motion Picture Herald

General Release 
The Aristocats
 On the Buses*
 Soldier Blue
 Carry on Loving*
 Dad's Army*
 Get Carter*
 There's a Girl in My Soup*
 Percy*
 The Railway Children*
 Up Pompeii*
 When Eight Bells Toll*
(* British film)

Reserved Ticket Attraction 
 Song of Norway
 Love Story
 Ryan's Daughter
 Paint Your Wagon
 Waterloo

Most Popular Stars
Source: Motion Picture Herald
 Richard Burton
 Steve McQueen
 Dustin Hoffman
 Michael Caine
 Oliver Reed
 Glenda Jackson
 Candice Bergen
 Clint Eastwood
 Frankie Howerd
 Jack Nicholson

See also
1971 in British music
1971 in British radio
1971 in British television
1971 in the United Kingdom

References

External links
 

1971
Films
Lists of 1971 films by country or language